This is a list of Sasanian inscription, which include remaining official inscriptions on rocks, as well as minor ones written on bricks, metal, wood, hide, papyri, and gems. Their significance is in the areas of linguistics, history, and study of religion in Persia. Some of the inscriptions are lost and are known only through tradition.

List of Sasanian inscriptions 

Early royal Sasanian inscriptions were trilingual: Middle Persian (in Inscriptional Pahlavi), Parthian (in Inscriptional Parthian) and Greek. Since the rule of Narseh, Greek was omitted. Book Pahlavi script replaced Inscriptional Pahlavi in late Middle Persian inscriptions.

References 

http://www.iranicaonline.org/articles/sasanian-rock-reliefs

Sasanian inscriptions
History-related lists